Allen Lake is a lake in the municipality of Dysart et al, Haliburton County in Central Ontario, Canada. It is on Allen Creek and is in the Ottawa River drainage basin.

Geography
The lake is at the height of land between the Ottawa River drainage basin to the north and east, and the Trent River drainage basin to the west and southwest. The nearest named community is Pusey,  to the south just over the border into the neighbouring municipality of Highlands East.

The primary inflow is Allen Creek, arriving at the south from the direction of Little Allen Lake. There is one unnamed secondary inflow at the southwest. The primary outflow, at the northern end of the lake, is also Allen Creek, which flows via Benoir Lake, the York River and the Madawaska River to the Ottawa River.

References

Lakes of Haliburton County